WAMW may refer to:

 WAMW-FM, a radio station (107.9 FM) licensed to Washington, Indiana, United States
 WAMW (AM), a radio station (1580 AM) licensed to Washington, Indiana, United States
 Bubung Airport in Luwuk, Central Sulawesi, Indonesia